Viv Thicknesse (1910–1986) was an Australian dual-code rugby half-back, a  state representative in both rugby league and rugby union. His  rugby league career was spent with the champion Eastern Suburbs sides of the 1930s and he represented Australia in that code in seven Tests.

Playing career
Following his schooling at  Sydney Boys High School in the 1920s, Thicknesse was a half-back with Sydney's Eastern Suburbs Rugby Union Club. He switched to the professional code in 1931 and joined Eastern Suburbs' rugby league side. He was a member of the Tricolours' champion teams of the 1930s and won consecutive premierships with the club in the NSWRL seasons of 1935, 1936 and 1937. He captained the 1937 side.

He represented New South Wales on eleven occasions between 1933 and 1936 and made his international debut for Australia on the 1933-34 Kangaroo tour of Great Britain where he appeared in two Tests and in sixteen minor matches. He played in further Test series against New Zealand in 1935 and against Great Britain in 1936 for a total of seven career Test appearances. He is listed on the Australian Players Register as Kangaroo No. 181. He formed a formidable representative halves pairing with Wests great Vic Hey and with his Easts clubmate Ernie Norman.

Accolades
A halfback, Thicknesse was renowned for his passing game and was selected in Eastern Suburbs 'Team Of The Century'. Dally Messenger once said of Viv Thicknesse that "he rated him the equal of any half he had seen play the game".

In February 2008, Thicknesse was named in the list of Australia's 100 Greatest Players (1908–2007) which was commissioned by the NRL and ARL to celebrate the code's centenary year in Australia.

Legacy 
Viv Thicknesse maintained scrapbooks throughout his playing career, and a diary of the 1933-34 Kangaroo tour of Great Britain. In 2012, the State Library of New South Wales acquired Viv Thicknesse's scrapbooks and diaries.

Sources
 Andrews, Malcolm (2006) The ABC of Rugby League Austn Broadcasting Corpn, Sydney
 Whiticker, Alan  & Hudson, Glen (2006) The Encyclopedia of Rugby League Players, Gavin Allen Publishing, Sydney

References

1910 births
1986 deaths
Australian rugby league players
Australian rugby union players
Eastern Suburbs players
Sydney Roosters players
New South Wales rugby league team players
New South Wales Waratahs players
Australia national rugby league team players
Rugby league players from Temora, New South Wales